The 2023 EFL Cup final was the final of the 2022–23 EFL Cup. It was played between Manchester United and Newcastle United at Wembley Stadium in London, England, on 26 February 2023. This was Newcastle's first final since the 1999 FA Cup final, in which Manchester United defeated them 2–0.

Newcastle were aiming to end one of the longest trophy droughts in English football, with their last major honour being the 1968–69 Inter-Cities Fairs Cup. However, the scoreline from 1999 was repeated, as Manchester United won their first competitive trophy since 2017.

Both clubs were allocated 867 tickets in safe standing areas of Wembley, making this the first major domestic English men's final in nearly 35 years to allow supporters to stand. On the morning of the final, the Met Police estimated at least 100,000 Newcastle United fans, with and without tickets, were in and around Wembley.

Route to the final

Manchester United

As a Premier League club involved in the 2022–23 UEFA Europa League, Manchester United received a bye to the third round where they were drawn at home to fellow Premier League club Aston Villa with the match played at Old Trafford on 10 November. Manchester United won 4–2 with goals for Manchester United from Anthony Martial, Marcus Rashford, Bruno Fernandes and Scott McTominay and goals for Aston Villa from Ollie Watkins and an own goal from Diogo Dalot. In the fourth round, Manchester United were drawn at home again to EFL Championship club Burnley who are currently managed by former Manchester City player Vincent Kompany with the match played at Old Trafford on 21 December. Manchester United won 2–0 with goals from Christian Eriksen and Rashford. In the quarter-finals, Manchester United were drawn at home to EFL League One club Charlton Athletic with the match played at Old Trafford on 10 January 2023. Manchester United won 3–0 with goals from Antony and two from Rashford. In the semi-finals, which were played over two legs, Manchester United was drawn against Nottingham Forest with the first-leg away at the City Ground on 25 January. Manchester United took a 3–0 lead with goals from Rashford, Wout Weghorst and Fernandes. The second-leg was played at Old Trafford on 1 February, with Manchester United winning 2–0 (5–0 on aggregate) with goals from Martial and Fred.

Newcastle United

As a Premier League club not involved in any UEFA competitions, Newcastle United entered the cup in the second round where they were drawn away to EFL League Two club Tranmere Rovers with the match played at Prenton Park on 24 August 2022. Newcastle won 2–1 with goals for Newcastle from club captain Jamaal Lascelles and Chris Wood, after Elliott Nevitt had given Tranmere the lead. In the third round, they were drawn at home to fellow Premier League club Crystal Palace, with the match played at St James' Park on 9 November. The tie ended as a 0–0 draw after 90 minutes so a penalty shoot-out was used to determine the outcome, with Newcastle winning 3–2 as Wood, Kieran Trippier and Joelinton converted their penalties for the home side, while Sven Botman and Bruno Guimarães missed theirs. Will Hughes and Joel Ward converted their penalties for Palace, with club captain Luka Milivojević, Jean-Philippe Mateta and Malcolm Ebiowei all having theirs saved by Nick Pope. In the fourth round, Newcastle were drawn at home once more to another Premier League club in Bournemouth, with the match played at St James' Park on 20 December. Newcastle won 1–0 with an own goal from Adam Smith. The match saw Newcastle manager Eddie Howe face his former club. In the quarter-finals, Newcastle were drawn at home for the third consecutive round against Leicester City, with the match played at St James' Park on 10 January 2023. Newcastle won 2–0 with goals from Dan Burn and Joelinton. In the semi-finals, which were played over two legs, Newcastle were drawn against Southampton with the first-leg played away at St Mary's Stadium on 24 January. Newcastle took a 1–0 lead in the tie with a goal from Joelinton. The second-leg was played at St James' Park on 31 January, with Newcastle winning 2–1 (3–1 on aggregate) with two goals from Sean Longstaff and a consolation goal for Southampton from Ché Adams. However, Guimarães was sent off, though he did not miss the final due to the three-match ban being enforced in the Premier League, with him instead missing Newcastle's next three league matches against West Ham United, Bournemouth and Liverpool. On February 18, Pope was sent off against Liverpool in a 0–2 home loss and missed the final against Manchester United.

Match

Details

Notes

References

External links

EFL Cup Finals
EFL Cup final
EFL Cup Final
EFL Cup Final
Events at Wembley Stadium
League Cup Final 2023
League Cup Final 2023